Sardar Sikandar Hayat Khan (1 June 1932 – 9 October 2021) was elected as Prime Minister twice and president twice of Azad Jammu and Kashmir (AJK).  He was the longest-serving Prime Minister of AJK.

Early life and education
Born into an eminent political family of Kashmir, Khan was the son of Nawab Muhammad Hayat Khan, famous for his role in one of the first major uprisings against the Dogra regime in 1931. His father led the protest against a tax on salt imposed by the Maharaja's regime.

Sardar Sikandar Hayat Khan received his early schooling in his native village of Karela in Fatehpur Thakiala, now in District Kotli, and in Poonch city. He went on to study at Gordon College (Rawalpindi), graduating in 1956 before going on to the University Law College in Lahore to obtain a law degree in 1958.

Career
After formally joining the All Jammu and Kashmir Muslim Conference, he ran for membership in the Kotli council, a position he occupied for eight years, during which he was also elected the President of Bar Association, Kotli. In 1970, he was elected to the Azad Jammu & Kashmir Legislative Assembly and became the Revenue Minister in 1972.

He returned to office from his constituency in every election held in Azad Kashmir between 1970 and 2001, barring the years when he was President of Azad Kashmir. His brother Sardar Muhammad Naeem Khan served as a member from that area during that period.

He served as acting President of the Jammu & Kashmir Muslim Conference in the 1976–78 period and was elected President in 1978, a position he held until 1988. In 1985, he was elected Prime Minister of AJK and served until 1990. He headed the opposition in the Assembly until 1991, when he was elected President of AJK for a five-year term. On 25 July 2001, he was sworn in as Prime Minister of AJK for a second time, serving another five-year term. Khan initially retired from active politics in July 2006. However, he later played a major role in introducing Pakistan Muslim League (N) in AJK for which he was given the position of Senior Vice President of PML-(N) in 2011.

He quit PML-(N) in February 2021 and joined the Muslim Conference as head of the party.

Death
On 9 October 2021, Hayat, who was diabetic and a cardiac patient, died in his hometown; aged 87.

References

External links
 Prime Ministers of Azad Jammu and Kashmir
 Presidents of Azad Jammu and Kashmir
 Government of Azad Kashmir

People from Poonch District, Pakistan
1934 births
2021 deaths
Presidents of Azad Kashmir
Prime Ministers of Azad Kashmir
Pahari Pothwari people
Deaths from diabetes
Government Gordon College alumni
Deaths from the COVID-19 pandemic in Punjab, Pakistan